Putevaya Usadba 9 km zheleznoy dorogi Luostari–Nikel is a rural locality (an inhabited locality) in Pechengsky District of Murmansk Oblast, Russia, located beyond the Arctic Circle. In 2010, its population was 0 (Census).

References

Notes

Sources

Rural localities in Murmansk Oblast